Juglandeae is a tribe of the Juglandoideae subfamily, in the Juglandaceae family.

Walnut tree species comprise the Juglans genus, which belong to the Juglandeae tribe.

 Tribe Juglandeae
  Subtribe Caryinae
 Carya Nutt. – hickory and pecan
 Annamocarya A.Chev.
  Subtribe Juglandinae
 Cyclocarya Iljinsk – wheel wingnut
 Juglans L. – walnut
 Pterocarya Kunth – wingnut

References 

 
 
Rosid tribes